Robert Harris (1764–1862) was a nineteenth century Anglican priest and educator, most notable for his long running campaign to create a free public library and substantive museum in Preston, Lancashire.

Harris was born in Clitheroe on 20 February 1764; and was educated at the town's grammar school. He graduated B.A. from Sidney Sussex College, Cambridge in 1787; M.A. in 1790; and B.D. in 1797.  He was Headmaster of Preston Grammar School from 1788 until 1835; and Vicar of Preston from 1798 until his death on 6 January 1862. His son completed his father's campaign.

References 

Alumni of Sidney Sussex College, Cambridge
18th-century English Anglican priests
19th-century English Anglican priests
Clergy from Preston, Lancashire
People educated at Clitheroe Royal Grammar School
1764 births
1862 deaths
Schoolteachers from Preston, Lancashire